Roberta is a Canadian short drama film, directed by Caroline Monnet and released in 2014. The film stars Marie Brassard as Roberta, a housewife and mother who turns to drugs and alcohol to deal with the stultifying conformity of her suburban life.

The film premiered in 2014 at the imagineNATIVE Film + Media Arts Festival.

The film received a Canadian Screen Award nomination for Best Live Action Short Drama at the 4th Canadian Screen Awards.

References

External links 
 

2014 short films
2014 films
2014 drama films
Films directed by Caroline Monnet
French-language Canadian films
Canadian drama short films
2010s Canadian films